P&D Coachworks is an Australian bus bodybuilder in Murwillumbah.

History
P&D Coachworks was formed in 1990 by Paul & Debbie McGavin. In February 1995 it completed its first coach.

In 2012, it completed its 500th body.

References

External links
Bus Australia gallery

Bus manufacturers of Australia
1990 establishments in Australia